The 2022–23 Florida Atlantic Owls men's basketball team represents Florida Atlantic University in the 2022–23 NCAA Division I men's basketball season. The Owls are led by fifth-year head coach Dusty May and play their home games at Eleanor R. Baldwin Arena in Boca Raton, Florida as members of Conference USA.

On January 16, 2023, the Owls were ranked in the AP poll for the first time in program history.

On October 21, 2021, Florida Atlantic accepted an invitation to join the American Athletic Conference (AAC) and will become a full-member on July 1, 2023. As a result, this season will be the program's last season as a member of Conference USA.

This season saw Florida Atlantic win their first NCAA Tournament game in school history, defeating 8-seed Memphis 66–65 in the round of 64. As well first Sweet 16 appearances in school history, defeating 16–seed Fairleigh Dickinson 78–70.

Previous season
The Owls finished the 2021-22 season 19–15, 11–7 in C-USA play to finish in third place in the East Division. They defeated Southern Miss in the second round of the C-USA tournament before losing to UAB in the quarterfinals. The Owls received an invitation to the College Basketball Invitational, where they lost to Northern Colorado in the first round.

Offseason

Departures

Incoming transfers

2022 recruiting class

Roster

Schedule and results

|-
!colspan=12 style=|Regular season

|-
!colspan=9 style=| Conference USA tournament

|-
!colspan=9 style=}| NCAA tournament

Source

Rankings

*AP does not release post-NCAA Tournament rankings.

Notes

References

Florida Atlantic Owls men's basketball seasons
Florida Atlantic
Florida Atlantic Owls men's basketball
Florida Atlantic Owls men's basketball
Florida Atlantic